Duncan Weld Shaw is a former British Columbia Supreme Court Justice who served on the Court from 1987 to 2007. Shaw is best known for his ruling in R. v. Sharpe that Canada's law prohibiting child pornography was unconstitutional. In another case, he ruled that the media cannot publish the names of young offenders charged with serious crimes, including murder, until a transfer hearing to adult court takes place and a 30-day appeal period expires.

Personal life
Shaw earned a Bachelor of Arts (1955) and a Bachelor of Laws (1956) from the University of British Columbia. In 1961, he married Patricia Nan Gardner.

References

External links
Personal website

Judges in British Columbia
Living people
Year of birth missing (living people)